The Mittagong Formation is a sedimentary rock unit in the Sydney Basin in eastern Australia.

Formation
Laid down in the Triassic Period, it may be seen as an interval of interbedded fine-grained sandstone and shale between the Ashfield Shale (above) and the Hawkesbury sandstone (below). The maximum thickness around Sydney may be ten metres. Near Town Hall railway station, the formation is 8 metres thick.  In the type area at Mittagong it is 15 metres thick.

Whereabouts
In northern Sydney it can be seen in several areas, such as West Pymble and Mount Ku-ring-gai. This rock formation is associated with the critically endangered Sydney Turpentine-Ironbark Forest.

See also
Narrabeen group

References

Geologic formations of Australia
Triassic Australia
Sandstone formations
Shale formations
Geology of New South Wales